Bromadryl may refer to:
 Phenmetrazine
 Embramine (antihistamine)